Sajid Khan (born 3 September 1993) is a Pakistani cricketer who plays for Khyber Pakhtunkhwa. He made his international debut for the Pakistan cricket team in April 2021.

Career
He made his first-class debut for Peshawar in the 2016–17 Quaid-e-Azam Trophy on 22 October 2016. He made his List A debut on 20 January 2017 for Peshawar in the 2016–17 Regional One Day Cup. He made his Twenty20 debut for Peshawar in the 2018–19 National T20 Cup on 11 December 2018.

In January 2021, following the final of the 2020–21 Quaid-e-Azam Trophy, he was named as the Best Bowler of the tournament. Later the same month, he was named in Khyber Pakhtunkhwa's squad for the 2020–21 Pakistan Cup.

In January 2021, he was named in Pakistan's Test squad for their series against South Africa. In March 2021, he was again named in Pakistan's Test squad, this time for their series against Zimbabwe. He made his Test debut for Pakistan, against Zimbabwe, on 29 April 2021. In December 2021, in the second match against Bangladesh, Khan took his first five-wicket haul in Test cricket.

In September 2022, Sajid Khan signed for Somerset for the remainder of the County Championship season.

References

External links
 

1993 births
Living people
Pakistani cricketers
Pakistan Test cricketers
Peshawar cricketers
Somerset cricketers
Cricketers from Peshawar